Stephen Daniels (born 3 September 1976) is a former Australian rules footballer who played with Port Adelaide in the Australian Football League (AFL).

Daniels, a defender, was part of Port Adelaide's inaugural squad in 1997, after being picked up by the club as a zone selection, from Norwood. In 1999 he played 20 games, one of which was Port Adelaide's qualifying final loss to the Kangaroos.

References

1976 births
Australian rules footballers from South Australia
Port Adelaide Football Club players
Port Adelaide Football Club players (all competitions)
Living people